Major Sir Herbert Paul Latham, 2nd Baronet (22 April 1905 – 24 July 1955) was a British Conservative Party politician who served as Member of Parliament (MP) for Scarborough and Whitby constituency from 1931 to 1941.

Biography
The son of Sir Thomas Paul Latham and his wife Florence Clara née Walley, he was educated at Eton College and Magdalen College, Oxford.

Between 1928 and 1934 Latham was a member of the London County Council, representing Lewisham East as a member of the Conservative-backed Municipal Reform Party.

At the 1929 general election, he stood as the Conservative candidate in Rotherham,  a safe seat for the Labour Party where he was runner-up with 23% of the votes.

In April 1931 the standing MP for Scarborough and Whitby, Sidney Herbert, resigned from the House of Commons. Latham was selected as the Conservative candidate for the resulting by-election on 6 May, which he won with a majority of 5% of the votes over his Liberal Party opponent.

Arrest, attempted suicide and court-martial
During World War II, despite being exempt from military service, Latham volunteered to join the army. In 1941, however, he was arrested  for "improper behaviour", a homosexual act, with three gunners and a civilian (letters he had written to those involved had been discovered) while serving as an officer in the Royal Artillery.

Latham then tried to kill himself by riding a motorcycle into a tree.

He was court-martialled and found guilty of ten charges of indecent conduct and of attempted suicide and was discharged dishonourably and imprisoned for two years without hard labour. Latham's court-martial was the first time a sitting MP who was also in the army had been court-martialled since Lieutenant-General Sir John Murray in 1815. He resigned his seat in Parliament. After his release in 1943 Latham commented to his fellow MP Henry Channon that he had found conditions and treatment at Maidstone Gaol better than at Eton.

Family
In 1933 Latham married Lady Patricia Doreen Moore, the daughter of Henry Moore, 10th Earl of Drogheda and Kathleen Pelham Burn. She divorced him in 1943 and died in 1947. He was succeeded in the baronetcy by their only son, Richard Thomas Paul Latham, born in April 1934.

In 1932 Latham purchased Herstmonceux Castle in Sussex and carried on its restoration.

References

External links
 

1905 births
1955 deaths
Gay politicians
Conservative Party (UK) MPs for English constituencies
UK MPs 1929–1931
UK MPs 1931–1935
UK MPs 1935–1945
Baronets in the Baronetage of the United Kingdom
LGBT members of the Parliament of the United Kingdom
English LGBT politicians
Members of London County Council
Royal Artillery officers
British Army personnel of World War II
British Army personnel who were court-martialled
English politicians convicted of crimes
People educated at Eton College
LGBT military personnel
20th-century British LGBT people